For the Gayton Windmill now in Merseyside see Gayton Windmill, Cheshire

Gayton Mill  is a Grade II listed tower mill at Gayton, Norfolk, England which has been truncated and converted to holiday accommodation.

History

A post mill was standing at Gayton in 1797 when it was marked of Faden's map of Norfolk. The mill was advertised for sale in 1815 and 1819. The tower mill had been built by 1824, when it was marked on the first edition Ordnance Survey map of Norfolk. Robert Matthews was the miller in 1836. In 1872, the mill was offered to let. By then a steam mill powered by a  Clayton & Shuttleworth steam engine was working an additional three pairs of French Burr millstones. The mills were taken by Edward Lewis, who had previously been at a watermill at West Acre. The mill was sold by auction on 23 September 1873 at the Globe Hotel, King's Lynn. It was bought by Edward Lewis. The mills remained in the Lewis family, and a limited company, Gayton Mills Co Ltd, was formed in 1919. The mill had ceased working by wind at this time, power being provided by a Blackstone paraffin engine. The engine was later replaced by a diesel engine. The sails were removed c1925. The mills were worked by engine until 1937. The mill retained its cap and fanstage in 1933 but had become derelict by 1949. The cap and top storey of the mill had been removed by the time the mill buildings were advertised for sale by auction in King's Lynn on 29 July 1980. They were withdrawn from the auction and later sold privately. The new owners converted the mill to a residential craft centre. They also planned to restore the cap and sails of the mill. In 1987, planning permission was granted to use the mill as seasonal holiday accommodation.  It is now, (2011, I don`t know when its use changed)  however used as accommodation for people who unfortunately have mental health problems.

Description

Gayton Mill was an eight storey tower mill with a stage at the third floor. It had an ogee cap, and was winded by a six bladed fantail. It had four Patent sails and drove three pairs of overdrift millstones. The surviving stone nut is of cast iron with wooden teeth. The upright shaft is partly wooden and partly cast iron. The great spur wheel is cast iron, it has a cast iron crown wheel underneath. The tower has been truncated by one storey and the top is crenellated.

Millers

Robert Matthews 1836-46
Walter Hall 1853-72
Edward Lewis 1872-92
Henry Lewis 1896-1900
Alred Lewis 1998-1919
Alfred Littleproud 1901
Gayton Mills Co 1912-19
Gayton Mills Co Ltd 1919-37

Reference for above:-

References

External links
Windmill World webpage on Gayton Mill.

Towers completed in 1824
Industrial buildings completed in 1824
Windmills in Norfolk
Tower mills in the United Kingdom
Grinding mills in the United Kingdom
Grade II listed buildings in Norfolk
Grade II listed windmills